Chiseled in Stone is the tenth studio album by American country music artist Vern Gosdin. It was released in 1988 via Columbia Records. The album peaked at number 7 on the Billboard Top Country Albums chart.

Track listing

Personnel
 Mark Casstevens - acoustic guitar
 Rodney Collins - background vocals 
 Sonny Garrish - steel guitar
 Vern Gosdin - lead vocals, background vocals
 Hoot Hester - fiddle
 Jerry Kroon - drums
 Carol Montgomery - background vocals
 Ron Oates - keyboards
 Billy Sanford - electric guitar
 Jim Vest - steel guitar
 Dennis Wilson - background vocals
 Bob Wray - bass guitar
 Road Manager - Mike Adams
 Sound Engineer - Buck Jarrell

Charts

Weekly charts

Year-end charts

References

1988 albums
Vern Gosdin albums
Columbia Records albums
Albums produced by Bob Montgomery (songwriter)